1 Bligh Street is a skyscraper in Sydney, New South Wales, Australia.

The modern style office building is located in the Sydney central business district overlooking Circular Quay, the Sydney Harbour and the Sydney Harbour Bridge.

Design

The premium grade office tower was designed by Ingenhoven Architects of Germany and Architectus of Australia.

It is an ecologically sustainable development and was awarded six-star green status by the Green Building Council of Australia. Green features include a basement sewage plant that recycles 90 percent of the building waste water, solar panels on the roof and air conditioning by chilled beams. It is Australia's first major high-rise building with a full double-skin façade with external louvres. These conserve energy, eliminate sky glare and optimise user comfort. The angle of the louvre blades is automatically adjusted according to their orientation to the sun. A naturally ventilated, full height atrium, on the southern side of the building, maximises natural light to each office level.

The building also houses a childcare centre, two cafés and a basement car park for 96 cars.

The large-scale aluminium sculpture at the top of the curving steps at the entrance on the corner of Bligh and O'Connell streets is by New York-based Australian James Angus. The developers describe it as "a complex network of three-dimensional ellipsoidal surfaces drawn from shapes expressed in the design of the building", adding that its brightly painted colour scheme traces the underlying geometry of the sculpture.

The building was named the Best Tall Building Award in Asia & Australasia for 2012 in the Council on Tall Buildings and Urban Habitat's Skyscraper Awards, won the 2012 International Highrise Award and the 2012 Harry Seidler Award for Commercial Architecture.

Major tenants
 Bloomberg L.P. 
 Clayton Utz
Office of the Prime Minister of Australia
 Commonwealth Parliament Offices 
 Oil Search
Preqin
 Vault Systems

See also
Buildings and architecture of Sydney
List of tallest buildings in Sydney

References

External links

1 Bligh official website
1 Bligh Street at Cbus Property website
1 Bligh Street at Architectus website
1 Bligh Street at enstuct website
1 Bligh Street at Arup website

Office buildings completed in 2011
Skyscrapers in Sydney
Office buildings in Sydney
2011 establishments in Australia
Skyscraper office buildings in Australia
Sydney central business district